Cnemaspis phillipsi is a species of diurnal gecko endemic to island of Sri Lanka.

References

 http://reptile-database.reptarium.cz/species?genus=Cnemaspis&species=phillipsi

Reptiles of Sri Lanka
Reptiles described in 2007
phillipsi